"Loved You a Little" is a song by the American rock group, The Maine. The song features Charlotte Sands and Taking Back Sunday's singer Adam Lazzara. It was available for pre-order on January 21, 2022 until being released digitally on January 27, 2022. The song was serviced to alternative radio on February 8, 2022. The song peaked at number 8 on the Alternative Airplay chart and at number 14 on the Rock & Alternative chart.

Background
"Loved You a Little" has been described as a "break-up anthem". John O'Callaghan spoke about the meaning of the song and working with Adam Lazzara of Taking Back Sunday and Charlotte Sands in an interview with Alternative Press magazine.

That same interview, Charlotte Sands spoke about being featured on the song.

The band teamed up with Alternative Press and released a limited edition red heart flexi-disc single of the song in April 2022. An acoustic version of the song was released on May 20, 2022.

Music video
The music video was directed by Lupe Bustos. It was released on January 28, 2022.

Track listing
Digital single 
"Loved You a Little" – 3:27

Acoustic single
"Loved You a Little" (Acoustic) – 3:24
"Loved You a Little" – 3:27

Personnel
Credits adapted from AllMusic.

The Maine
 John O'Callaghan – vocals
 Jared Monaco – lead guitar
 Kennedy Brock – rhythm guitar
 Garrett Nickelsen – bass
 Pat Kirch – drums

Additional musicians
 Charlotte Sands – vocals
 Adam Lazzara – vocals

Production
 John O'Callaghan – producer
 Matt Keller – mastering engineer, producer

Charts

Weekly charts

Year-end charts

Release history

References

2022 songs
The Maine (band) songs